Bellevue Independent School District is a public school district based in Bellevue, Texas (USA).

Finances
As of the 2010–2011 school year, the appraised valuation of property in the district was $48,481,000. The maintenance tax rate was $0.117 and the bond tax rate was $0.000 per $100 of appraised valuation.

Academic achievement
In 2011, the school district was rated "academically acceptable" by the Texas Education Agency.

In 2019, the school district the Texas Education Agency 2019 Accountability Ratings rated Bellevue ISD in two categories:

 Student Achievement: An average rating of 84 out of 100   
 School Progress: An average rating of 84 out of 100

Schools
In the 2011–2012 school year, the district had one open school.
Bellevue School (Grades K-12)

Sports
Jacob Eckeberger (All District 1st team)
Terrance Perry (Defensive MVP)
Tyler Allen (All District 1st team)

Academic Achievements
Jacob Eckeberger (State Number Sense)
Tyler Allen (State Number Sense)

See also

List of school districts in Texas
2019 Accountability Rating

References

External links

School districts in Clay County, Texas